Fred Armon Toomer (1889–1961) was Third Vice-President and member of the Board of Directors of Atlanta Life Insurance Company.

Fred A. Toomer Elementary School in Atlanta, Georgia was dedicated in his memory on April 21, 1968.

References

External links
 Atlanta Life Insurance Company
New Georgia Encyclopedia entry on Atlanta Life Insurance Company

1889 births
1961 deaths